Hydrocotyle bonariensis, the largeleaf pennywort, once a member of the family Apiaceae, now in the family Araliaceae and of the genus Hydrocotyle, is a hairless and creeping perennial.

Description
Flowers This plant has numerous white to creamy-yellow flowers, and the flower stalks can be  in height.
Fruits and reproduction The stems creep and root at the nodes; the plant spreads by rhizomes. Dollar Weed produces a dry dehiscent fruit that, at maturity, splits into two or more parts each with a single seed.
Habitat This plant lives in sandy areas of somewhat extreme conditions: very dry lands that are flooded sometimes.
Community species
Ipomoea pes-caprae
Senecio crassiflorus
Juncus acutus
Co-dominate species
Imperata brasiliensis
Bacopa monnieri

Distribution
This species colonizes sandy ground and disturbed foreshore sites, estuaries, coastline, sand dunes and ponds.  H. bonariensis has also displayed a tendency to prefer, and be stronger at, higher elevations.
Native
Afrotropic:
West-Central Tropical Africa: Cameroon
West Tropical Africa: Côte d'Ivoire, Ghana, Liberia, Nigeria, Senegal
South Tropical Africa: Angola, Mozambique
Southern Africa: South Africa
Western Indian Ocean: Madagascar, Mauritius, Réunion
Nearctic:
Southeastern United States: Alabama, Florida, Georgia, Louisiana, Mississippi, North Carolina, South Carolina
South-Central United States: Texas
Neotropic:
Central America: Costa Rica, Guatemala, Nicaragua, Panama
Caribbean: Cuba, Puerto Rico
Northern South America: Venezuela
Brazil: Brazil
Western South America: Bolivia, Colombia,  Peru
Southern South America: Argentina, Chile,  Paraguay, Uruguay

Neighbors
Colombian communities  In a remote sensing project for rapid ecological evaluation, H. bonariensis was found in Colombia inhabiting several of the evaluated areas; the last two communities are considered exceptional for the diversity.

References

External links

bonariensis
Flora of Africa
Flora of the Western Indian Ocean
Flora of the Southeastern United States
Flora of South America
Flora of Australia
Flora without expected TNC conservation status